Julien Ictoi (born 22 March 1978) is a retired French footballer.

Career
Ictoi was born in Poissy. Initially, he began his career playing as a striker, but switched to defense in 2007 after signing with Pacy Vallée-d'Eure. Ictoi has spent the majority of his career playing in the amateur divisions of France, most notably with Mantes, whom he made over 100 appearances with. In 2010, he ventured to his native homeland of Guadeloupe joining CS Moulien. In his inaugural season with the club, Ictoi won the Guadeloupe Division d'Honneur.

Honours
 Guadeloupe Division d'Honneur: 2010–11

References

External links
 Profile at Foot-National

1978 births
Living people
People from Poissy
Association football defenders
Association football forwards
French footballers
Guadeloupean footballers
Guadeloupe international footballers
French people of Guadeloupean descent
US Quevilly-Rouen Métropole players
Pacy Ménilles RC players
FC Mantois 78 players
2011 CONCACAF Gold Cup players
Footballers from Yvelines